Bisra railway station is a railway station on the South Eastern Railway network in the state of Odisha, India. It serves Bisra village. Its code is BZR. It has two platforms. Passenger, Express trains halt at Bisra railway station.

Major Trains

 Samaleshwari Express
 Kalinga Utkal Express

References

See also
 Sundergarh district

Railway stations in Sundergarh district
Chakradharpur railway division